Cam Loch (the Crooked Loch) is one of a number of water supply sources for the Crinan Canal. The impounding reservoir lies to the south of the canal and about 3 kilometres west of Lochgilphead. It has an earthwork dam 8.5 metres high, with records showing that construction was before 1860.

See also
 List of lochs in Scotland
 List of reservoirs and dams in the United Kingdom

Sources
"Argyll and Bute Council Reservoirs Act 1975 Public Register"

Reservoirs in Argyll and Bute